Fatma Sfar-Ben-Chker (born 20 March 1994) is a Tunisian handball player. She plays for the ASF Mahdia and in the Tunisian national team. She represented Tunisia at the 2013 World Women's Handball Championship in Serbia and the 2011 Pan Arab Games in Qatar. She was part of the team winning 2014 African Women's Handball Championship in Algeria.

References

Tunisian female handball players
1994 births
Living people
People from Mahdia